This is a list of the National Register of Historic Places listings in Hardin County, Texas.

This is intended to be a complete list of properties listed on the National Register of Historic Places in Hardin County, Texas. There are two properties listed on the National Register in the county. One property is also a Recorded Texas Historic Landmark.

Current listings

The locations of National Register properties may be seen in a mapping service provided.

|}

See also

National Register of Historic Places listings in Texas
Recorded Texas Historic Landmarks in Hardin County

References

External links

Hardin County, Texas
Hardin County
Buildings and structures in Hardin County, Texas